Heinz Richter (1 November 1909 – 14 May 1971) was a German radio engineer and one of the most successful authors of introductory-level radio and electronics textbooks in Germany from the 1950s throughout the 1970s.

Biography

Born in Gehrden, Germany, Richter was influenced early by the books of Walther de Haas ("Hanns Günther").  He enrolled in the Höhere Technische Lehranstalt in Munich, from which he graduated as Engineer in 1932.

Already in 1934, in cooperation with Günther, Richter published his first textbook for radio engineers, Schule des Funktechnikers, which immediately became popular.  This was soon followed by a revised edition of Günther's classic, Elektrotechnik für Jungen (Electronics for Boys).

In the 1930s and 1940s, Richter worked as a development engineer and engineering group leader at the radio research group of the Aeronautical Research Institute in Oberpfaffenhofen  (Forschungsinstitut für Flugfunk) under Prof. Max Dieckmann (today, the RF and Radar laboratory of DLR, the German Aerospace Center).

After 1945, Richter pursued a career as an independent author and engineering consultant.  He held 10 patents and wrote over 1,000 articles for trade publications.

In the late 1950s, Richter designed the "Kosmos" radio and electronics experimental kits sold by publisher Franckh-Kosmos.

Works

Richter was a prolific writer, whose books enjoyed long-term popularity.  Revised editions of some (e.g. Elektrotechnik für Jungen) were published until the 1980s.  He has however been criticized for superficiality – while some books contain detailed building instructions along with pictures of sample kits, others (e.g.  Schaltungsbuch der Transistortechnik ) are little more than commented collections of industry application circuits.

 Schule des Funktechnikers, Hanns Günther & Heinz Richter
 Elektrotechnik für Jungen, Heinz Richter (based on Hanns Günther), 1948 (revised editions until 1982)
 Radiotechnik für Alle, 1949
 Vol. I, Radiotechnik für Alle Vol. II, UKW-FM Vol. III, Fernsehen für Alle, 1951
 Vol. IV, Der Kurzwellen-Amateur (Karl Schultheiß)
 Radiopraxis für Alle Vol. I, Der Bau von Normal- und UKW-Empfängern Vol. II, Fernseh-Experimentier-Praxis Vol. III, Der Ultrakurzwellen-Amateur (Karl Schultheiß)
 Vol. IV, Tonaufnahme für Alle, 1953
 Vol. V, Elektro-Akustik für Alle, 1954
 Praxis der Elektronik Vol. I, Elektronik in Selbstbau und Versuch Vol. II, Praktische Elektronik für jeden Beruf Vol. III, Transistorpraxis 
 Radiobasteln für Jungen, 1958
 Neue Schule der Radiotechnik und Elektronik Vol. I, Allgemeine Grundlagen, Bauelemente, 1958
 Vol. II, Grundschaltungen der Radiotechnik und Elektronik, 1959
 Vol. III, Geräte, Anlagen, Verfahrenstechnik der Radiotechnik und Elektronik, 1959
 Vol. IV, Meßgeräte und Meßverfahren, 1959
 Meßpraxis, 1961
 Schaltungsbuch der Transistortechnik Bastelbuch der Mini-Elektronik, 1969

References
 Richter obituary, Funk-Technik 12/1971, p. 445 (http://homepage.bluewin.ch/radiomann/Heinz_Richter/HeinzRichter.gif)
 Mini biography, in Bastelbuch der Mini-Elektronik, 4th ed.
 Bibliography, in Radiopraxis für Alle''

External links 
 Thread on Richter biography at Radiomuseum
 Heinz Richter  (German)

1909 births
1971 deaths
Engineers from Lower Saxony
Hobby electronics authors
People from Hanover